Edward "Ed" Neilson is an American politician and member of the Democratic Party. In April 2012, he won a special election to represent the 169th District in the Pennsylvania House of Representatives.  In May 2014 he won a special election to serve as an at-large member of Philadelphia City Council replacing outgoing councilmember Bill Green. In August 2015, he won a special election to represent the 174th District in the Pennsylvania House of Representatives.

Early life and education
A native of Northeast Philadelphia, Neilson is a graduate of Abraham Lincoln High School.

Political career
Neilson is a former political director for the International Brotherhood of Electrical Workers (IBEW)'s Local 98 chapter. He went on to serve as Pennsylvania Department of Labor and Industry Executive Deputy State Labor Secretary under Governor Ed Rendell, and eventually became director of business development and government relations at Chartwell Law Offices.

PA State Senate

2022 Special Election

Neilson was considered for the 5th Senatorial District seat after John Sabatina resigned on December 31, 2021 after being elected to the Philadelphia Court of Common Pleas the previous month. After a meeting of Democratic leaders asked to not be considered and Ward Leaders Shawn Dillon, Connie Dougherty, Alan Butkovitz, Pat Parkinson, Jim Donnelly, Bobby Henon, John Del Ricci, Harry Enggasser, Pete McDermott and John Sabatina Sr decided to support Shawn Dillion.

Shawn Dillion failed to submit his financial disclosures which were required by law for candidacy and was forced to drop out. He was replaced as a candidate by his brother Jimmy Dillion.

PA State House

2012 Special Election
In November 2011, Republican Denny O'Brien was elected to one of the Philadelphia City Council's at-large seats. O'Brien, who had comfortably held the 169th District seat in the State House for several decades, resigned from the General Assembly the following January. O'Brien's departure in part precipitated the decision on the part of the House Republican leadership to move the 169th district out of Philadelphia and into York County. The existing 169th district was to be split among the districts of Democrats Brendan Boyle, Kevin Boyle, Michael McGeehan and John Sabatina, Jr., as well as Republican John Taylor. However, the State Supreme Court struck-down the map, ruling its splitting of cities, townships and boroughs was unconstitutional. Therefore, a special election held on the existing boundaries was called for April 24, 2012.

Neilson entered the race to succeed O'Brien, and won the Democratic primary unopposed. In the special election, he faced Dave Kralle, a long-time aide to O'Brien who served as his Chief of Staff at the end of his legislative tenure. On election day, Neilson defeated Kralle, and will hold the seat until January 2013. He will again face Kralle in the November 2012 general election, this time vying for a full two-year term.

2015 Special Election

Tenure
Neilson was sworn-in on May 8, 2012. He served on the Children and Youth, and Veterans Affairs and Emergency Preparedness committees.

City Council

2014 Special Election
In February 2014, former City Council Member Bill Green and was sworn in as the chair of the School Reform Commission.  He was nominated by Governor Tom Corbett. In March 2014, Democratic ward leaders picked Neilson for the City Council special election that would be held in May 2014.
Neilson entered the race to succeed Bill Green, and won the special election to defeat Matt Wolfe, a Republican ward leader from West Philadelphia. He later resigned the seat on June 19, 2015.

Tenure
Neilson was sworn into Philadelphia City Council on August 14, 2014 and resigned on June 19, 2015.

Personal life
Neilson, his wife and five sons currently reside in Northeast Philadelphia.

References

External links
State Representative Ed Neilson official caucus website
Ed Neilson (D) official PA House website
Ed Neilson for State Representative official campaign website

Democratic Party members of the Pennsylvania House of Representatives
Philadelphia City Council members
Living people
21st-century American politicians
Year of birth missing (living people)